Emil Magnusson (23 November 1887 – 26 July 1933) was a Swedish athlete who won a bronze medal at the 1912 Olympics in the two-handed discus throw. In this event the final result was a sum of best attempts with a right hand and with a left hand. He finished eighth in the traditional discus throw competition.

References

1887 births
1933 deaths
Swedish male discus throwers
Olympic bronze medalists for Sweden
Athletes (track and field) at the 1912 Summer Olympics
Olympic athletes of Sweden
Medalists at the 1912 Summer Olympics
Olympic bronze medalists in athletics (track and field)
People from Lund Municipality
Sportspeople from Skåne County